Arginine glutamate (also called glutargin) is a mixture of two amino acids, 50% arginine and 50% glutamic acid, used in liver therapy.

Amino acids
Combination drugs